Roosevelt André Credit is a professional singer, actor, conductor and music educator who has appeared in Broadway productions including Show Boat and Porgy and Bess.

Early life 
A native of Oakland, California, Credit attended Oregon State University, graduating with a degree in Music Education in 1990. Following that, Credit earned a Master of Music in Voice and Opera Performance, and a Master of Music in Conducting from Northwestern University.

Career 
A bass/baritone singer, Credit has performed in numerous venues including the Chicago Opera Theatre, the Birmingham Opera, and the New York Contemporary Opera. He made his Broadway debut at the Gershwin Theatre in 1994 when he appeared as a stevedore/member of the ensemble in Show Boat. In 2009, he was a featured performer at Barack Obama's Pennsylvania Inaugural Ball and, in 2012, he was cast in the role of A Fisherman in a production of Porgy and Bess mounted at the Richard Rodgers Theatre. His vocals also appear in two songs used in the soundtrack to the movie 12 Years a Slave -- "My Lord Sunshine (Sunrise)," and "O Teach Me Lord."

References

External links 
 
 Roosevelt Credit Oral History Interview

Living people
Year of birth missing (living people)
Place of birth missing (living people)
Musicians from Oakland, California
Oregon State University alumni
Northwestern University alumni
American basses
American baritones
American male musical theatre actors